Kaoru Shibata (born 25 June 1973) is a former professional tennis player from Japan.

Biography
Shibata was born in Tokyo, but grew up in the United States, where she moved to as a child in 1975. She attended Libertyville High School in Chicago.

During the 1990s she competed on the professional tour, reaching career best rankings of 252 in singles and 117 in doubles.

At the 1995 Summer Universiade in Fukuoka she won a gold medal in the singles competition.

ITF finals

Doubles (3–2)

References

External links
 
 

1973 births
Living people
Japanese female tennis players
Universiade medalists in tennis
Sportspeople from Tokyo
Universiade gold medalists for Japan
Medalists at the 1995 Summer Universiade
20th-century Japanese women
21st-century Japanese women